Xiangyang is a town of Liuhe County, Jilin, China. , it has 13 villages under its administration.

References

Township-level divisions of Jilin
Liuhe County